Hagin is a surname. Notable people with the surname include:

Joe Hagin (born 1956), American politician
Kenneth E. Hagin (1917–2003), American Pentecostal preacher
Wayne Hagin (born 1956), American sportscaster

See also
Hagen
Hagins